Acanthocarpus is a genus of crabs in the family Calappidae, containing the following species:
 Acanthocarpus alexandri Stimpson, 1871
 Acanthocarpus bispinosus A. Milne-Edwards, 1880
 Acanthocarpus brevispinis Monod, 1946
 Acanthocarpus delsolari Garth, 1973
 Acanthocarpus meridionalis Mané-Garzon, 1980

References

Calappoidea
Decapod genera
Taxa named by William Stimpson